Jet 24 International Airways was an American charter airline that operated from 1979 until its demise in 1986.

History
The history of Jet 24 began as Jet Charter Service in August 1979 and began services in December 1981.  The first flights were freight only between Miami and Caracas using a Boeing 707-320C. Two more 707s were later acquired and then in 1983, Jet 24 received permission to fly passenger charter flights; two McDonnell Douglas DC-10s were acquired for charter flights to South America and Europe.

Scheduled services began in May 1985 with a route Miami to San Juan, Madrid, then Paris and Zurich were added later.  But Jet 24's financial situation deteriorated rapidly and by August 1985, the company went into Chapter 11 bankruptcy protection. By October 1985 there was not money to continue operating and later ceased to exist.

Destinations

Paris - Charles de Gaulle Airport

San Juan - Luis Muñoz Marín International Airport

Madrid - Adolfo Suárez Madrid–Barajas Airport

Zurich - Zurich Airport

Miami - Miami International Airport Hub

Fleet
Jet 24 operated the following aircraft:

5 Boeing 707-320C
2 Boeing 747-100
1 Douglas DC-8-62F (Leased to LACSA)
2 McDonnell Douglas DC-10-40

See also
 List of defunct airlines of the United States

References

External links

Fleet and Code information

Defunct airlines of the United States
Airlines established in 1979
Airlines disestablished in 1985